Patelloa is a genus of flies in the family Tachinidae.

Species
P. facialis (Coquillett, 1897)
P. fuscimacula (Aldrich & Webber, 1924)
P. leucaniae (Coquillett, 1897)
P. meracanthae (Greene, 1921)
P. pachypyga (Aldrich & Webber, 1924)
P. pluriseriata (Aldrich & Webber, 1924)
P. reinhardi (Aldrich & Webber, 1924)
P. setifrons (Aldrich & Webber, 1924)
P. silvatica (Aldrich & Webber, 1924)
P. specularis (Aldrich & Webber, 1924)

References

Exoristinae
Diptera of North America
Tachinidae genera
Taxa named by Charles Henry Tyler Townsend